Edgewood is a city in Van Zandt County, Texas, United States. The population was 1,441 at the 2010 census. The town draws its name from its location on the far western edge of the East Texas timberline on U.S. Highway 80, approximately 60 miles east of Dallas.

Geography

Edgewood is located at  (32.696860, –95.885036).

According to the United States Census Bureau, the town has a total area of 1.4 square miles (3.5 km2), all of it land.

Demographics

As of the 2020 United States census, there were 1,530 people, 558 households, and 439 families residing in the town.

Politics
The city of Edgewood is a Republican stronghold, like the rest of Van Zandt County. The city of Edgewood's limits are coterminous with Van Zandt County voter precinct 1E.

Education
The Town of Edgewood is served by the Edgewood Independent School District.

Notable people

 Chad Morris, College Football Coach

Newspapers and publications
 Edgewood Enterprise
 Van Zandt County News

References

External links
 Edgewood Heritage Festival
 City of Edgewood

Towns in Texas
Towns in Van Zandt County, Texas